William "Willy" Rovelli (born 18 March 1975) is a French actor, writer, columnist, comedian, and television personality. He is the chef on the French television game show Fort Boyard.

Early life
William Rovelli was born on 18 March 1975 in Cluses, Haute-Savoie and spent his childhood in Annecy. When he was 17, he moved to Paris.

References

External links

 Chronic Willy Europe 1

1975 births
Living people
French male film actors
French male television actors
French comedians
French television personalities
French columnists
21st-century French male actors
People from Haute-Savoie
French people of Italian descent